Susheela or Sushila is an Indian name. People with the name include:

 P. Susheela, Indian playback singer
 Susheela Raman, British Tamil musician
 Susheela Gopalan, Indian Communist leader
 Susheela Laxman Bangaru, member of 14th Lok Sabha
 Sushila Ganesh Mavalankar (1904–95), Indian freedom fighter
 Sushila Nayyar, personal secretary and physician to Mohandas Karamchand Gandhi
 Sushila Kerketta, member of the 14th Lok Sabha
 Sushila Tiriya, Member of the Parliament of India
 Sushila Swar, Nepalese politician

See also
 Susheela (film), a 1963 film